Valérie Crunchant (born 1978) is a French actress.

She was born in Évry, Essonne, a suburb of Paris.

Valérie Crunchant appears in All the fine promises (2003),  directed and written by Jean-Paul Civeyrac (based on Anne Wiazemsky's novel) as the young Ghislaine.

In Capitaine Achab (2004) directed by Philippe Ramos she incarnates Achab's spouse whose white skin remains the white whale which appears in his dreams.

She made her first appearance on the stage with Francis Huster in «Théâtre Marigny» (Paris, 1992) in «Suite Royale» by Crébillon and in «Le Cid» by Pierre Corneille.

In 2004, she appeared as Cérès in the play «Les Felins m’aiment bien» by Olivia Rosenthal (directed by Alain Ollivier). In 2006 and 2007, she is La Comtesse in «La Fausse Suivante» by Marivaux (directed by Elisabeth Chailloux).

Filmography
Reminiscence (2001)
Le livre (The book, 2001) 
A la hache (2002)
All the Fine Promises (2003)
Capitaine Achab (2004)
À travers la forêt (2005)
Guillaume et les sortilèges (2006)

References

External links
 
  Valérie Crunchant DVD toile
   Valérie Crunchant in «La Fausse Suivante» by Marivaux
  Valérie Crunchant DVD toile

1978 births
Living people
People from Évry, Essonne
French film actresses
French stage actresses
21st-century French actresses
Cours Florent alumni